Historicism or historism comprises artistic styles that draw their inspiration from recreating historic styles or imitating the work of historic artists and artisans. This is especially common in architecture, where there are many different styles of Revival architecture, which dominated architecture for large buildings in the 19th century. Through a combination of different styles or implementation of new elements, historicism can create completely different aesthetics than former styles. Thus, it offers a great variety of possible designs.

Overview

In the history of art, after Neoclassicism which in the Romantic era could itself be considered a historicist movement, the 19th century included a new historicist phase characterized by an interpretation not only of Greek and Roman classicism, but also of succeeding stylistic eras, which were increasingly respected. In particular in architecture and in the genre of history painting, in which historical subjects were treated with great attention to accurate period detail, the global influence of historicism was especially strong from the 1850s onwards. The change is often related to the rise of the bourgeoisie during and after the Industrial Revolution. By the end of the century, in the fin de siècle, Symbolism and Art Nouveau followed by Expressionism and Modernism acted to make Historicism look outdated, although many large public commissions continued in the 20th century. The Arts and Crafts style managed to combine a looser vernacular historicism with elements of Art Nouveau and other contemporary styles.

The influence of historicism remained strong until the 1950s in many countries. When postmodern architecture became widely popular during the 1980s, a Neohistorism style followed, that is still prominent and can be found around the world, especially in representative and upper-class buildings.

Western historicist styles 

International
 Baroque Revival
 Beaux-Arts
 Byzantine Revival
 Egyptian Revival
 Gothic Revival
 Greek Revival / Neo-Grec
 Moorish Revival
 Neoclassical
 New Classical / Neohistorism
 Renaissance Revival (Châteauesque/Italianate/Palazzo style)
 Romanesque Revival
 Second Empire
 Swiss chalet style
 Vernacular

British Empire
 Adam style
 Bristol Byzantine
 Carpenter Gothic (Canada)
 Edwardian Baroque
 Indo-Saracenic Revival (India)
 Jacobethan
 Queen Anne style
 Regency
 Scottish baronial style (Scotland, Wales and Northern Ireland)
 Tudor Revival / Black-and-White Revival

France
 Directoire style
 Empire style
 Napoleon III style

Austria and Germany
 Biedermeier
 Gründerzeit
 Nazi architecture
 Resort style
 Rundbogenstil

Greece and Balkans
 Mycenaean Revival
 Serbo-Byzantine Revival

Italy
 Stile Umbertino

Mexico
 Spanish Colonial Revival architecture
 Mayan Revival

Netherlands
 Traditionalist School

Portugal
 Pombaline
 Neo-Manueline
 Soft Portuguese style

Romania
 Romanian Revival

Russian Empire and USSR
 Byzantine Revival
 Russian Revival
 Stalinist architecture

Scandinavia
 Dragestil
 National Romantic style
 Nordic Classicism

Spain
 Neo-Mudéjar

United States
 Jeffersonian architecture
 American Renaissance
 Carpenter Gothic
 Collegiate Gothic
 Colonial Revival
 Federal style
 Greco Deco
 Mayan Revival
 Mediterranean Revival
 Mission Revival
 Polish Cathedral style
 Pueblo Revival
 Queen Anne style
 Richardsonian Romanesque
 Spanish Colonial Revival
 Territorial Revival

See also
Gründerzeit
Revivalism (architecture)
Resort architecture - a specific style of historicism, that is popular on the German Baltic Sea coast
Academicism
Musical historicism

References

External links

Art movements
 
19th century in art
19th century in the arts